Louisiana Music Factory is an independent record and CD store located on Frenchmen Street in the Faubourg Marigny neighborhood of New Orleans, Louisiana. Its specialty is local music, and is well-known among music aficionados around the world. Its rich inventory of New Orleans and Louisiana music include CDs and vinyl of traditional jazz, blues, rhythm and blues, zydeco and Cajun music, many of which are on local independent labels and hard to find outside the Louisiana region.

The store also holds weekly in-store performances throughout the year. Many performances showcase local artists, especially during the New Orleans Jazz & Heritage Festival period.

History

The store was opened in February 1992 by founders Jerry Brock and Barry Smith on North Peters Street in the French Quarter. Brock had been known as one of the founders of the local community radio station WWOZ, and a producer who first recorded the Dirty Dozen Brass Band.

In 1996, the store moved to a location on Decatur Street within the French Quarter. The Decatur Street store was two-storied, devoting the second floor to vintage vinyl. In 2001, Brock left the store to pursue other opportunities, and Smith became the sole owner.

The store suffered little damage by Hurricane Katrina in 2005 and was one of the first record stores to reopen after the storm.

In March 2014, the store moved to its current location at 421 Frenchmen Street in the French Quarter, downriver from the Decatur Street location.

References

External links
 Official website
 Official FB Page
 Official Twitter Page
 Official Myspace Page

Music of New Orleans
French Quarter
Music retailers of the United States
Companies based in New Orleans
Tourist attractions in New Orleans
1992 establishments in Louisiana